Yuanhe may refer to:

Locations
 Yuanhe, Hongjiang (沅河镇), a town of Hongjiang City, Hunan.
Yuanhe Subdistrict, Suzhou (元和街道), a subdistrict in Xiangcheng District, Suzhou, Jiangsu, China
Yuanhe Subdistrict, Xinyu (袁河街道), a subdistrict in Yushui District, Xinyu, Jiangxi, China
Yuanhe Subdistrict, Yunhe County (元和街道), a subdistrict in Yunhe County, Zhejiang, China

Historical eras
Yuanhe (84–87), era name used by Emperor Zhang of Han
Yuanhe (806–820), era name used by Emperor Xianzong of Tang

See also
Yuan He (403–479), Northern Wei official
Genna(元和), a Japanese era name with the same spelling as Yuanhe in Chinese characters